Experimental Marriage is a 1919 American silent romantic comedy film directed by Robert G. Vignola and starring Constance Talmadge, Harrison Ford, and Walter Hiers.

Cast 
 Constance Talmadge as Suzanne Ercoll
 Harrison Ford as Foxcroft Grey
 Walter Hiers as Charlie Hamilton
 Vera Sisson as Do Harrington
 Edythe Chapman as Mrs. Ercoll
 Raymond Hatton as Arthur Barnard
 Mayme Kelso as Mrs. Entwhisle
 James Gordon as Callahan

References

Bibliography 
 Langman, Larry. American Film Cycles: The Silent Era. Greenwood Publishing, 1998.

External links 

1919 films
1919 romantic comedy films
American romantic comedy films
Films directed by Robert G. Vignola
American silent feature films
1910s English-language films
Selznick Pictures films
American black-and-white films
1910s American films
Silent romantic comedy films
Silent American comedy films